Hovdala Castle is a castle in Hässleholm Municipality, Scania, in southern Sweden. Its oldest visible parts date from the early 16th century although the original construction dates back to at least the early 12th century.

History
Hovdala was mentioned for the first time in 1130, but the buildings that visitors can see today were mainly constructed during the early 16th century. The date 1511 can be read on one of the façades. Back then, Scania was part of Denmark.The castle name was written 'Howdale'in the mid 17th-century.

The squire Magnus Rabek is mentioned in written sources as having owned the estate sometime before the Black Death. During the early 15th century, the estate belonged to a squire named Klement Skaldra. At the end of the century, the estate passed to the Laxmand family, who erected the oldest of the presently visible buildings. Through marriage it later passed to the Grubbe family. During the ownership of Sigvard Grubbe, an educated man who stood close to the king, Christian IV of Denmark, and who had studied in Wittenberg and Basel, the castle was besieged twice by Swedish troops during the Kalmar War. The castle withstood the sieges.

After the death of Sigvard Grubbe, the castle passed between different owners until it became the property of Jens Mikkelsen (Michelsen), an officer in the Danish army, in 1651. After the conquest of Scania by Sweden in 1658, he chose to stay on in Scania and had to resign public office in Denmark. He had previously served with the Danish chancellor of the Exchequer in Copenhagen. Mikkelsen, like all other Scanians who chose to pledge faith to the Swedish king and stay on, now became a Swedish subject. During the Scanian War of 1676-1679, Mikkelsen found himself in a difficult situation. Scania became a no man's land where the Danes ruled one day and the Swedes the next. Mikkelsen was reported to the Danes as a Swedish spy in the summer of 1677, but then he went to the Danish Army Camp outside Malmö and reported about the latest Swedish troop movements in northern Scania and denounced the Swedish commander Johan Gyllenstjerna's cruel methods. Reports of this can be found in the Danish National Archives. He also applied for a salva guardie certificate that would spare his estate from Danish attacks. According to family tradition, Mikkelsen considered returning to Denmark at the time. Nevertheless, the castle was assaulted, pillaged and burnt by pro-Danish guerilla fighters on 7 August 1678.

Mikkelsen survived the ordeal and was later ennobled by the Swedish king, and took the name Ehrenborg. The castle thenceforth stayed in the Ehrenborg family until 1944, when it was expropriated by the Swedish state. The last owners were however allowed to keep living in the castle and did not move out until 1981.

From 1944, the former land of the estate was used as a military training field. Today the land belongs to Hässleholm municipality.

A renovation of the castle was initiated in 1993. In 2004, renovation project was awarded the Europa Nostra award for "sensitive and intelligent restoration work."

Architecture

The castle complex consists of three buildings placed in a u-shape around a courtyard. These main buildings are surrounded by a former moat, which has today dried out. The oldest (northern) of the three buildings date from the early 16th century, possibly 1511 as is stated on its façade. The eastern building is somewhat later, dating from 1681-82. This was where the living quarters were located. It replaced an earlier building, destroyed during the Scanian War. The southern of the three buildings, by contrast, dates from 1805. Originally a fourth building existed, closing the courtyard, but of this building no traces remain. On the other side of the moat, once spanned by a now vanished drawbridge, lies a defensive tower, erected in the year 1600. The tower has withstood both battles the castle has been involved in. A stone plaque on the tower, bearing the date 1633, commemorates the siege endured in 1612 when the Swedes attacked the castle. The main, representative rooms of the former living quarters have been restored, including the family library, and is open to the public via guided tours. The historical environment displayed represents that of the upper middle classes or lower aristocracy, rather than the higher echelons of Danish/Swedish aristocracy or the working class.

In 2009, the municipal library of Hässleholm received a donation of about 3,500 books, mainly about the history of the district in which Hovdala Castle is located. They were donated by the former ambassador, minister without portfolio and Social democratic politician Sven-Eric Nilsson. The books are today housed in one of the annexes to Hovdala Castle.

See also
List of castles in Sweden

References

External links

Castles in Skåne County